Maria Mika Maxine Perez Medina (born May 10, 1990) is a Filipino designer, actress, model and beauty pageant titleholder who was crowned Miss Universe Philippines 2016. She represented the Philippines at the Miss Universe 2016 pageant and finished as a Top 6 finalist.

Early life and education
Maria Mika Maxine Perez Medina was born in Quezon City, Metro Manila, Philippines. She obtained a bachelor's degree in interior design from the De La Salle–College of Saint Benilde and in Philippine School of Interior Design (PSID). She is a commercial print ad model and a senior member of Professional Models Association of the Philippines. Dianne Medina is her cousin and Binibining Pilipinas-Universe 1990 Germelina Padilla is her aunt.

Acting career
In 2018, she made her television debut in Hanggang Saan as Atty. Georgette Sandiego. She later played Isay in Los Bastardos which ran from October 2018 to September 2019. She was paired with Jake Cuenca in the series.

In 2020, she transferred to both TV5 Network via Brightlight Productions's Sunday 'Kada and GMA Network for First Yaya as the villainous and hateful Lorraine.

Filmography

Film

Television

Pageantry

Binibining Pilipinas 2016

Medina joined Binibining Pilipinas 2016 on April 17, 2016 held at the Smart Araneta Coliseum in Quezon City, where she was crowned as Miss Universe Philippines 2016.

During the question and answer portion of the pageant, she was asked:  "Even if her parents want to send her to school, a 15-year-old girl wants to stop her studies, what would be your advise to her?" She responded:
I would tell the girl to study hard, no matter what their parents would tell them. Because having an education is something that… something that… cannot have that anybody else [sic]...Education can make you an even better person. Thank you.

At the end of the event, she succeeded outgoing Miss Universe Philippines 2015 and Miss Universe 2015, Pia Wurtzbach and also bagged the Miss Philippine Airlines award.

On April 30, 2017, Medina crowned Rachel Peters as her successor at the Binibining Pilipinas 2017 pageant held at the Smart Araneta Coliseum in Quezon City, Philippines.

Miss Universe 2016

Medina represented the Philippines at the Miss Universe 2016, and placed in the Top 6. With this, the Philippines placed in the semifinals for the seventh consecutive year.

At the national costume competition, Medina wore a Rhett Eala creation that was inspired by the vinta, a traditional boat from Mindanao, matched with a head piece made to resemble a large piece of coral found in the country's reefs. The whole ensemble is said to have cost more than P1 million to make as it was also adorned with south sea pearls.

At the preliminary competition, Medina debuted her 'alta' walk which involved rolling the shoulders in perfect sync with the gliding of hips. She wore a green and white striped bikini at the preliminary swimsuit competition and sashayed in a flowing green gown with a fringe skirt by Rhett Eala at the preliminary evening gown competition.

At the coronation, Medina advanced to Top 13. She wore a green and white striped bikini at the Top 13 swimsuit competition which let her advance to Top 9. She wore a silver-red evening gown crafted by Rhett Eala at the Top 9 evening gown competition and was able to advance to Top 6.

During the question and answer portion of the Top 6 finalists, she was asked: "What is the most significant change you've seen in the world in the last 10 years?" She responded:
In the last 10 years of being here in the world is that I saw all the people bringing in one event like this in Miss Universe, and it's something big to us that we are one, as one nation, we are all together.

Medina concluded her Miss Universe journey by finishing as a Top 6 semifinalist. Iris Mittenaere of France won the said pageant.

Personal life
On April 4, 2022, she became engaged to her boyfriend Timmy Llana.

References

1990 births
Living people
Binibining Pilipinas winners
Filipino female models
Miss Universe 2016 contestants
People from Quezon City
De La Salle–College of Saint Benilde alumni
Filipino designers
Filipino film actresses
ABS-CBN personalities
TV5 (Philippine TV network) personalities
GMA Network personalities
Filipino television actresses